is a 2021 Japanese drama film directed by Ryusuke Hamaguchi and written by Hamaguchi and Takamasa Oe. It is based on the short story of the same name by Haruki Murakami from his 2014 collection, Men Without Women, while taking inspiration from "Scheherazade" and "Kino", two other stories from the collection. Starring Hidetoshi Nishijima, Tōko Miura, Masaki Okada, and Reika Kirishima, the film follows Yūsuke Kafuku (Nishijima) as he directs a production of Uncle Vanya, while still grieving over the death of his wife.

The film had its world premiere at the Cannes Film Festival on 11 July 2021, in competition for the Palme d'Or, and was released in Japan on 20 August. It grossed $15.3million worldwide, including $8.6million in Japan and $2.3million in the United States and Canada. Rotten Tomatoes, a review aggregator surveyed 216 reviews and judged 97% to be positive.

Drive My Car received numerous awards and nominations, particularly for Hamaguchi's direction, Nishijima's performance, and the screenplay. Hamaguchi and Oe became the first Japanese writers to win Best Screenplay at the Cannes Film Festival, where the film also won the FIPRESCI Prize and the Prize of the Ecumenical Jury. At the 94th Academy Awards, the film was nominated for Best Picture, Best Director and Best Adapted Screenplay, and won Best International Feature Film. It was the first Japanese film to receive a Best Picture nomination. The film won nine awards at the 45th Japan Academy Film Prize, including Picture of the Year, Director of the Year, and Screenplay of the Year. It also garnered ten nominations at the 2022 Mainichi Film Awards, winning Best Film and Best Director.

Accolades

Notes

References

External links
 

Drive My Car